Ding Yexian (born October 1960) is a Chinese politician, and the current executive deputy secretary of the Communist Party of China committee of Tibet Autonomous Region.

Biography
Ding is considered a native of Yanggu County, Shandong province.  In January 1978, Ding was dispatched to the Shannan Prefecture of Tibet to work as an electric utility operator. In September 1985, he graduated from the Shandong Electronics Professional College (now Shandong College of Electronic Technology); he holds a bachelor's degree in computer science. In December 1996, Ding was promoted to the head of the economic and trade reform commission of Shannan Prefecture. In November 1998, he was named head of the Shannan department of finance. He was further promoted to the Tibet regional department of finance in April 2000, then in January 2003, assumed the post of director of the regional finance bureau.

In January 2009, Ding was named assistant to the Chairman of the Tibet Autonomous Region (TAR). In September 2010, he was promoted to Vice Chairman of the Tibet Autonomous Region. In June 2013, he was named a member of the regional party standing committee of the TAR, deputy party secretary of the TAR. In November 2016, he was named Executive Vice Chairman of the TAR. In June 2017, he was officially named the Executive Deputy Party Secretary of the Tibet Autonomous Region.

He also holds a part-time Master's of Business Administration from the Sichuan Business School (四川省工商管理学院).

References

External links
CV of Ding Yexian

1960 births
Politicians from Liaocheng
Living people
Alternate members of the 19th Central Committee of the Chinese Communist Party
People's Republic of China politicians from Shandong
Chinese Communist Party politicians from Shandong
Political office-holders in Tibet